John Foster Parish (18 September 1875 – 10 February 1944) was an Australian rules footballer who played with Collingwood in the Victorian Football League (VFL).

Notes

External links 

John Parish's profile at Collingwood Forever

1875 births
1944 deaths
Australian rules footballers from Victoria (Australia)
Collingwood Football Club players